Chris Tuson (born 25 February 1988) is an English former professional rugby league footballer who played as a . He spent most of his career at the Wigan Warriors (Heritage № 1008), but also played for the Blackpool Panthers, Castleford Tigers (Heritage № 906) and Hull F.C.

Background
Born in Leyland, Lancashire, Tuson started his career with amateur clubs Leyland Warriors and Bamber Bridge, and attended Balshaw's CE High School.

Career
He was signed by Wigan Warriors in 2006, and made his first team début from the bench against Leeds Rhinos in 2008.

In 2010, Tuson made his second appearance for Wigan against Castleford Tigers, and also made one appearance for Blackpool Panthers as a dual registration player before joining Castleford on loan for one month. The loan deal was later extended, and Tuson went on to appear eight times for the club.

In June 2013, he rejected a new contract from Wigan and agreed to join Wakefield Trinity Wildcats for the start of the 2014 season. However, the move failed to materialise due to Wakefield's financial problems, and Tuson opted to join Hull F.C. instead.

He played in the 2013 Challenge Cup Final victory over Hull F.C. at Wembley Stadium.

In July 2014, Tuson announced his retirement due to a recurring back injury.

External links
(archived by web.archive.org) Wigan Warriors profile
 Chris Tuson Wigan Career Page on the Wigan RL Fansite.

References

1988 births
Living people
Blackpool Panthers players
Castleford Tigers players
English rugby league players
Hull F.C. players
People from Leyland, Lancashire
Rugby league locks
Rugby league players from Lancashire
Rugby league props
Rugby league second-rows
Wigan Warriors players